Beckford is a historic home located at Princess Anne, Somerset County, Maryland, United States. It is a late Georgian Flemish bond brick dwelling, five bays wide by three bays deep, two stories with a hipped roof and two large interior chimney stacks. It is situated on the crest of the slope rising from the eastern bank of the Manokin River.

Beckford was listed on the National Register of Historic Places in 1974.

References

External links
, including undated photo, at Maryland Historical Trust

Houses in Somerset County, Maryland
Houses on the National Register of Historic Places in Maryland
Georgian architecture in Maryland
National Register of Historic Places in Somerset County, Maryland